The Croxted was an English automobile built from 1904 to 1905 in Herne Hill, South London.  The cars were available with either a 10hp engine or a power unit of 14hp and four cylinders.

See also
 List of car manufacturers of the United Kingdom

References
David Burgess Wise, The New Illustrated Encyclopedia of Automobiles.

Defunct motor vehicle manufacturers of England
Herne Hill
Vehicle manufacture in London
Defunct companies based in London